The Kadesh inscriptions or Qadesh inscriptions are a variety of Egyptian hieroglyphic inscriptions describing the Battle of Kadesh (1274 BC). The combined evidence in the form of texts and wall reliefs provide the best documented description of a battle in all of ancient history.

The Egyptian version of the battle of Kadesh is recorded in two primary accounts, known as the Bulletin or Report and the Poem which are often placed side by side in the locations they were inscribed. In addition, some reliefs also inscribed in the same location offer pictorial depictions of the battle. Some scholars divide these accounts into three. The Bulletin is repeated seven times and the Poem eight times, spread across temples in Abydos, Temple of Luxor, Karnak, Abu Simbel and the Ramesseum, and two hieratic papyri.

Poem
The Poem or "Poem of Pentaur" (pntAwr.t) is known from eight inscriptions, and lists the peoples which went to Kadesh as allies of the Hittites. Amongst them are some of the Sea Peoples and many of the other peoples who would later take part in battles of the 12th century BC (see Battle of Kadesh).

The Poem has been questioned as actual verse, as opposed to a prose account similar to what other pharaohs had recorded.

Bulletin
The Bulletin or the Record is itself simply a lengthy caption accompanying the reliefs.

Eight copies survive today on the temples at Abydos, Karnak, Luxor and Abu Simbel, with reliefs depicting the battle.

Other inscriptions
In addition to these lengthy presentations, there are also numerous small captions used to point out various elements of the battle.

Outside of the inscriptions, a hieratic copy of the Poem is preserved in the Raifet-Sallier papyrus, of which the first page is lost, the second page ("Papyrus Raifet") is in the Louvre and the third page ("Papyrus Sallier III") is in the British Museum. However, this is "an inaccurate copy of the whole text".

Cuneiform references to the battle have been found at Hattusa, including a letter from Ramesses to Hattusili III written in response to a scoffing complaint by Hattusili about the pharaoh's victorious depiction of the battle. However, no annals have been discovered that might describe it as part of a campaign. Instead, there are various references made to it in the context of other events.

Copies

Poem
 Luxor Temple pylon, north side of both towers
 Karnak, outside the south wall of the Great Hypostyle Hall
 Abydos: Ramesses II temple

Bulletin
 Abu Simbel: Great Temple north wall of the first hall
 Ramesseum, west side of first pylon
 Luxor Temple pylon, south side

Reliefs
 Abydos: Ramesses II temple, outside walls
 Ramesseum, first pylon
 Ramesseum, second pylon
 Karnak
 Luxor Temple pylon: 
 Temple of Derr
 Abu Simbel: Great Temple north wall of the first hall

Gallery

See also
 Egyptian–Hittite peace treaty
 Commemorative stelae of Nahr el-Kalb

References

Bibliography
 
 
 Gardiner, A.H. 1960. The Kadesh Inscriptions of Ramesses II. Oxford

External websites
 Egyptian Accounts of the Battle of Kadesh

13th-century BC inscriptions
Sea Peoples
Egyptian inscriptions
Ramesses II
Military history of ancient Egypt
Abu Simbel